The men's double trap competition at the 2000 Summer Olympics was held on 20 September. Home shooter Russell Mark set a new Olympic record in the qualification round and was close to defending his inaugural double trap title from Atlanta, but lost the gold medal shoot-off to Richard Faulds. Fehaid Al Deehani won the first Olympic medal ever for Kuwait.

Records
The existing World and Olympic records were as follows.

Qualification round
The qualification round consisted of 25 doubles in the A programme, 25 in the B programme, and 25 in the C programme.

OR Olympic record – Q Qualified for final

Final 
The final repeated the C programme for the top six competitors.

References

Sources

Shooting at the 2000 Summer Olympics
Men's events at the 2000 Summer Olympics